Pierre Caziot (24 September 1876 – 4 January 1953) was a French agricultural expert and administrator who was Minister of Agriculture and Supplies in the Vichy government during World War II (1939–45). He was a strong believer in the value of the peasant-owned family farm, and promoted the "back to the land" policies of Marshal Philippe Pétain during the war.

Agricultural expert (1876–1939)
Pierre Caziot was born in Crézancy-en-Sancerre, Cher, on 24 September 1876.
Caziot ran a  farm there that his family had owned for nearly 600 years.
He became well known as a farmer and agricultural engineer, and was a member of the Academy of Agriculture.
In 1919 he attacked the agrarian collectivism that the Left was advocating, and the move towards large, mechanized farms that some technocrats favored. 
Both would turn peasants into an agrarian proletariat.
He argued that for a peasant to be attached to the soil he had to own his plot of land.

In 1920 he wrote a tract in which he asserted that the family farm was the perfect basis for sound agriculture and a healthy nation.
The state should consolidate land units that were too small and break up large units into farms suitable for one family. He also called for regional land societies.
The state-subsidized societies would be organization by farmers associations.
They would have the power to buy and restructure farmland as it became available and resell it on easy terms to peasant farmers or the sons of peasants.
The proposal was reviewed favorably by the committee on agriculture of the Chamber of Deputies, but was not put to the vote.

Caziot joined the Crédit Foncier in 1924.
He became a high official in the Credit Foncier, the government land bank that Napoleon III had established.

World War II (1939–45)

Ministerial appointments
Caziot was named Minister of Agriculture and Supplies on 12 July 1940.
He learned of his appointment from a neighbor, who had heard the news on the radio.
Caziot hesitated to accept the unexpected offer of the Ministry of Agriculture, since he was deeply hostile to the Germans, but soon overcame his scruples.
He insisted that a separate ministry take responsibility for the supply of food.
Caziot was Minister of Agriculture and Supplies from 12 July 1940 to 6 September 1940, then Secretary of State for Agriculture and Supplies from 6 September 1940 to 13 December 1940 in the government of Marshal Philippe Pétain.
In December 1940 the secretariat of supplies was detached from the ministry.
Caziot was Minister and Secretary of State for Agriculture from 13 December 1940 to 18 April 1942 in the governments of Pétain and François Darlan.
He was succeeded by Jacques Le Roy Ladurie, who was also a passionate agrarian.
Le Roy Ladurie was younger, and more of a progressive corporatist.

Return to the land

Caziot believed in regionalism, seeing the traditional provinces as natural cultural and economic units, which he said were "drawn from the very entrails of the soil."
He promoted the "return to the land" and implemented measures to curb migration to the cities and to encourage creation of family farms.
Caziot wrote of the challenge he faced when he took office,

Caziot offered subsidies to peasants if they returned from the cities to work on unused land, provided loans on easy terms for modernization of rural houses, created a law on education to train more agronomists and to give rural children in basic education in agricultural technology, and implemented reforms to discourage the break-up of farms and to encourage the regrouping of scattered land holdings.
Caziot said after the war, "It was necessary to concentrate all my efforts on the task of giving the farm families of France a realization of their strength and a new pride in their life, for they and they alone were to preserve France and to bring it to a re-birth whatever happened."

Peasant Corporation

Caziot promulgated the law of 2 December 1940 that organized the Peasant Corporation.
Although he was in favor of a national peasant organization, he accepted the word "corporation" only at Pétain's insistence.
The concept was that each community would have a "corporative syndicate" of all peasant families, grouped into regional "corporative unions" which would meet periodically in a National Corporative Council.
Caziot lacked enthusiasm for corporatism and delayed implementation of the Peasant Corporation.
He appointed a provisional national organizing committee on 21 January 1941.
His commission, headed by Count Hervé Budes de Guébriant, was mostly made up of leading conservative landowners and took nearly two years to develop the legislation that became effective on 16 December 1942.

Jewish question

In October 1941 Caziot wrote to the Commissioner-General for Jewish Questions, Xavier Vallat, protesting against the effect his Aryanization and spoliation measures were having on the productivity of Jewish farmers and agricultural projects.
In December 1941 Vallat proposed in the State Council a motion to reduce participation of Jews in agriculture, limiting them to a single plot of land and banning them from positions of responsibility.
Caziot opposed the law, which he felt was against the best interests of the nation due to the agricultural crisis.
In January 1942 he said individuals should be encouraged to return to the land whatever their "race or religion".
In January 1942 he forced Vallat to make an exception for the Jews of Vaucluse, who had lived there for centuries.

Caziot's sole priority was to boost agricultural output. 
He wanted to keep the best qualified people in each job whatever their religion.
He often succeeded in keeping Jews in senior positions in agriculture in defiance of Vallat's rulings.
However, he had no interest in helping Jews unless they were useful in agriculture. In November 1941 he protested against the release of Jews who had no agricultural training from foreign workers' camps to work on projects for the Mission for the Restoration of Farming.

Last years (1945–53)

Caziot was tried by the High Court on 19 March 1947 for his participation in the Vichy government and sentenced to national degradation for life and loss of his property.
He was pardoned after a telegram from Otto Abetz was found in the Nazi archives demanding his arrest for hostility to collaboration.
He died in Paris on 4 January 1953.

Publications
Caziot's publications include:

Notes

Sources

1876 births
1953 deaths
French Ministers of Agriculture